Terrence James Brennan (born April 3, 1989) is an American professional ice hockey defenseman who is currently playing for HC Ajoie of the National League (NL). Brennan was originally selected by the Buffalo Sabres in the second round, 31st overall, of the 2007 NHL Entry Draft, and has also previously played for the Florida Panthers and Toronto Maple Leafs at the NHL level. Brennan has been cited as an elite offensive AHL defenseman, scoring at a pace of nearly a point-per-game, a rare feat for a defender.

Playing career

Amateur
Brennan is from Willingboro Township, New Jersey and grew up in Moorestown, New Jersey. He left Moorestown High School during his senior year to begin his career as a hockey player, later playing two seasons with the now-defunct St. John's Fog Devils of the Quebec Major Junior Hockey League (QMJHL) before moving with the team to Montreal, when it became the Montreal Junior Hockey Club. During the 2006–07 season, Brennan scored 16 goals and 25 assists in 68 games, winning the Raymond Lagacé Trophy as the QMJHL defensive rookie of the year.

Professional
Brennan was slotted as the 29th best prospect by the National Hockey League's Central Scouting in advance of the 2009 NHL Entry Draft. Brennan was described by Central Scouting as a good playmaker with a hard shot. He was selected by the Buffalo Sabres in the 2nd round, 31st overall in the draft. On April 18, 2009, Brennan signed a three-year, entry-level contract with the Sabres that began in the 2009–10 season. Brennan spent two seasons with the Sabres' American Hockey League (AHL) affiliate, the Portland Pirates. On November 23, 2011, Brennan made his NHL debut for the Sabres, also scoring his first career NHL goal against goaltender Tim Thomas of the Boston Bruins. He was returned to the AHL and played his third season with the Sabres' new AHL affiliate, the Rochester Americans. On March 15, 2013, Brennan was traded to the Florida Panthers in exchange for a fifth-round pick in the 2013 NHL Entry Draft. He played in 21 games total with the Sabres, registering two goals.

Brennan finished the season with the Panthers, playing in 19 games scoring 2 goals and 9 points. That offseason, on June 14, 2013, he was traded from the Panthers to the Nashville Predators in exchange for Bobby Butler. Brennan was not qualified by the Predators, however, and was released as an unrestricted free agent on July 1. On July 5, he then signed a one-year, two-way contract with the Toronto Maple Leafs worth $600,000. He was invited to the Maple Leafs training camp, but was cut and sent to Toronto's AHL affiliate, the Toronto Marlies after passing through waivers. He had an excellent season, winning the Eddie Shore Award as the AHL's most outstanding defenseman and played in the AHL's 2014 All-Star Game.

On July 4, 2014, Brennan buoyed by his successful season with the Marlies signed as an unrestricted free agent on a one-year NHL contract with the New York Islanders. However, after partaking in the Islanders' 2014 training camp, on October 4, Brennan was traded prior to the 2014–15 season, along with Ville Pokka and Anders Nilsson, to the Chicago Blackhawks in exchange for defenseman Nick Leddy in a cost-cutting move by the Blackhawks. Brennan was assigned to the Rockford IceHogs, the Blackhawks' AHL affiliate, after clearing waivers. He played in 54 games with the IceHogs before he was traded at the NHL trade deadline on February 26, 2015, to the Toronto Maple Leafs in exchange for Spencer Abbott. He was then reassigned for a second stint with the Marlies. During this season, he would also make his first appearance for the Maple Leafs, playing in 6 games for the club. Brennan was re-signed to a one-year contract following the seasons completion.

The following year, Brennan was a staple defenseman on the league leading Marlies, remaining at a point a game throughout the season and recording the second most points in the AHL. Brennan was called up to play in one game on March 9, 2016, due to an injury to the previous callup Victor Loov, who was injured in practice before playing a game. However, a few weeks later, on March 31, with few games remaining in the season, Brennan was one of four players called up to the Maple Leafs. On April 4, Brennan scored his first goal in the NHL in nearly 3 years, potting one in a 4–3 defeat of the Florida Panthers. Coincidentally, Brennan's last goal was on April 11, 2013, while playing for the Panthers. He finished the season with 25 goals and 68 points with the Marlies and 1 goal in 7 games with the Maple Leafs. For his stellar play with the Marlies, he won his second Eddie Shore Award as the AHL's best defenseman.

On July 5, 2016, Brennan signed a two-year contract with his hometown Philadelphia Flyers. During his fourth year within the Flyers organization with the Lehigh Valley Phantoms in the 2019–20 season, Brennan was unable to match his previous career scoring output, recording just 8 points through 28 games, before suffering an injury. On February 24, 2020, Brennan was traded at the NHL trade deadline by the Flyers to the Chicago Blackhawks in exchange for Nathan Noel. He was immediately assigned to join the Rockford IceHogs of the AHL.

On December 28, 2020, Brennan was an un-signed free agent and opted to sign abroad, agreeing to a contract for the remainder of the 2020–21 season with Swiss second-tier club, HC Thurgau of the Swiss League. He had 10 goals and 24 points for HC Thurgau. On June 18, 2021, Brennan signed with EC Red Bull Salzburg of the ICE Hockey League. With Salzburg, Brennan won the league championship, scoring 27 goals and 59 points in 60 games (playoffs included). He left the team in June 2022. On June 15, Brennan signed with HC Ajoie of the National League.

Career statistics

Awards and honors

References

External links

1989 births
Living people
HC Ajoie players
American men's ice hockey defensemen
Buffalo Sabres draft picks
Buffalo Sabres players
Florida Panthers players
Ice hockey players from New Jersey
Lehigh Valley Phantoms players
Moorestown High School alumni
People from Moorestown, New Jersey
People from Willingboro Township, New Jersey
Portland Pirates players
EC Red Bull Salzburg players
Rochester Americans players
Rockford IceHogs (AHL) players
Sportspeople from Burlington County, New Jersey
St. John's Fog Devils players
HC Thurgau players
Toronto Maple Leafs players
Toronto Marlies players